DripReport is an American music producer and singer. He is known for his Indian remixes of popular rap songs on YouTube. He further elevated to fame after his debut single "Skechers" went viral on TikTok and YouTube.

Early life and career 
DripReport parents emigrated from Pakistan to America. He graduated high school and later dropped out of college to focus on his music career. DripReport's age and identity remain unknown.

He started by making remixes of popular rap/hip-hop songs and eventually launched his debut single in January 2020. His song "Skechers" became an internet sensation. It went viral on social media platforms, especially TikTok, where more than 2.7 million videos used it as a sound. The song has also crossed 300 million streams on Spotify. Two remixed versions of the song were released in 2020, one featuring Tyga, and another featuring Badshah. This song has also topped charts worldwide.

Most of DripReport's remixes on YouTube are copyrighted and therefore he cannot make money through them. DripReport received a major-label deal with Arista Records after his success with "Skechers". It is rumored that he signed a contract of over one million dollars.

Discography

Singles 
 Skechers - ft Carbine
 Poison
 Places
 Blinding Lights
 Lemonade
 Calvin Kleins
 Moonlight
 Shotta Flow
 Indian 223s
 Panini
 Faneto
 Tesla - ft. Kyduh

Remixes 
 Tell em (remix) - $not, Cochise
 Skechers (remix) - ft. Badshah
 Way 2 Sexy (remix) - Drake ft. Future
 Die Very Rough (remix) - Mario Judah
 For the Night (remix) - Pop Smoke ft. Lil Baby & DaBaby
 Party Girl (remix) - StaySolidRocky
 Skechers (remix) - ft. Tyga
 Yummy (remix) - Justin Bieber
 Blinding Lights (remix) - The Weeknd
 The Box (remix) - Roddy Ricch
 Highest in the Room (remix) - Travis Scott
 Pop Out (remix) - Polo G, Lil Tjay
 Ransom (remix) - Lil Tecca

References 

Living people
Year of birth missing (living people)
American people of Pakistani descent
21st-century American male singers
21st-century American singers
American male rappers
21st-century American rappers
American hip hop record producers
Trap musicians
Arista Records artists